Kyeongbuk High School is a high school that is located in Daegu, South Korea.

Symbol

The flower that symbolizes the school is a magnolia, which means that become a person respected by others as grow to an excellent talented person and hold pure ideal like the flower. The tree is a zelkova, which shows that the education that has nourished a talented person harmonious and great spirit like the figure of the tree that is tough, well-to-do and neat.

History
Kyeongbuk High School was opened in 1899 with the name of Dalseong School. On 16 May 1916, the school was integrated and renamed to  Hyeopseong School. On 16 December 1917, the school was moved to Daebong-dong. It is the third public high school established by the government(Korean Empire) in the history of Korea.

Notable alumni and faculty
Roh Tae-woo, Former President of South Korea

External links

 

Educational institutions established in 1916
High schools in Daegu
Boys' schools in South Korea
1916 establishments in Korea